Errol Musk (born 1946) is a South African retired electromechanical engineer, pilot, sailor, consultant, and property developer who was once a co-owner of a Zambian emerald mine near Lake Tanganyika.

He is the father of business magnate and billionaire Elon Musk, restaurateur Kimbal Musk, and filmmaker Tosca Musk. He was married to Maye Musk and also to Heide Musk (née Bezuidenhout), with whom he has two children, Alexandra and Rose.

Early life and education 
Errol Musk was born in 1946 in Pretoria to Walter Henry James Musk and Cora Amelia Robinson. His father was a South African veteran of World War II and his mother was British. His grandmother was the first chiropractor in Canada.

Career and investments 
Musk worked as a pilot, a sailor, an electrical engineer, a mechanical engineer, a consultant, and a property developer, before retiring early. In 1969, he became a 50% owner of an emerald mine on Lake Tanganyika, that he bought for £40,000, funded by selling an airplane for £80,000. In a 2018 interview with Business Insider, Musk boasted that as a result of the emerald mine "we had so much money we couldn't even close our safe."

In 1972, he was elected to the Pretoria City Council as a representative of the anti-apartheid Progressive Party.

Errol Musk's claims that he invested in Elon Musk's software company Zip2 have been rejected by Elon Musk.

Personal life 
Musk met Maye Haldeman when he was 11 years old and they were childhood friends before marrying in 1970. She gave birth to three children; Elon Reeve Musk born on 28 June 1971, Kimbal Reeve Musk born on 20 September 1972, and Tosca Musk born on 20 July 1974. The family lived in Pretoria, where Maye worked as a dietician and a model. Musk told Agence France-Presse that he was a strict father who raised his children with discipline and austerity. After engaging in extra-marital affairs, Errol and Maye divorced in 1979, and both sons moved in with their father. Maye has stated that Errol beat her.

Musk was married to Heide Bezuidenhout for eighteen years and helped her raise her young daughter Jana Bezuidenhout, a child from a previous relationship. At the time of their marriage, Jana Bezuidenhout was four years old and lived together with them. Later in life, after splitting from Heide Bezuidenhout, he fathered two children with her daughter (his former step-daughter) Jana Bezuidenhout; a son born in 2017 and a daughter born in 2019. Musk described the first child as unplanned. At the time of their daughter's birth, according to The Times, Musk was 72 and Jana Bezuidenhout was 30 years old. As of 2022, Musk and Jana Bezuidenhout were no longer living together. Musk has a total of seven children. He is estranged from his son Elon.

In 1998, Musk shot and killed three out of six or seven burglars who forced their way into his Johannesburg home and who opened fire upon detection.

See also 
 Musk family

References 

Living people
South African mining businesspeople
South African sailors
South African engineers
South African businesspeople
South African people of British descent
People from Pretoria
Musk family
1946 births
People from Johannesburg
Elon Musk
South African political people